1870 was the 84th season of cricket in England since the foundation of Marylebone Cricket Club (MCC). It was in many ways a bridge between two eras of the game and, in a summer comparable for hot and dry weather to 1887, 1911, 1976 or 1995, saw W.G. Grace for the second of three successive years establish a record run aggregate, late-blooming slow bowler James Southerton become the first bowler to take 200 first-class wickets in a season and the first use of the heavy roller at Lord's. Although the heavy roller had been patented several decades earlier, its use was never seriously considered by MCC management despite many protests over the danger posed by the Lord's pitch where extremely frequent “shooters” alternated with balls that “flew” over the batsman's head. These dangerous pitches were viewed as a symbol of virility by many amateur batsmen, however; though when remembering one of W.G.’s finest innings – 66 on one of the roughest Lord’s pitches against a very strong Yorkshire attack against Yorkshire – fast bowlers Freeman and Emmett wondered how the champion was not maimed or killed outright.

An unfortunate accident to George Summers which led to his death from head injuries four days after being hit by a sharply rising ball from John Platts that had struck a loose pebble showed that in its first year the heavy roller had not radically altered the Lord’s pitch; though it was to do so from the following season

A number of thrilling finishes occurred, most famously the University Match where a hat-trick by Frank Cobden gave Cambridge the match when Oxford looked certain to win.

Playing record (by county)

Leading batsmen (qualification 15 innings)

Leading bowlers (qualification 800 balls)

Events 
 2–4 June: Gloucestershire County Cricket Club played its initial first-class match v. Surrey at Durdham Downs, near Bristol.
 15 June: George Summers, during the MCC v Nottinghamshire match at Lord's, is hit on the temple and dies four days later. It is generally thought that Summers should have been taken to hospital rather than ride a bumpy train to Nottingham.
 27, 28 June: "Cobden's Match". William Yardley scores the first century in the University Match, which Cambridge won by two runs after a hat-trick by Cobden when Oxford needed only three runs
 29 August: James Southerton becomes the first bowler to take 200 wickets in an English season when he takes his first wicket in Surrey's last match against Yorkshire
 4 November: Formation of Derbyshire County Cricket Club at a meeting in the Guildhall, Derby.

Notes 
Cambridgeshire, though still regarded in 1870 as first-class, played no inter-county matches

References

Annual reviews 
 John Lillywhite’s Cricketer’s Companion (Green Lilly), Lillywhite, 1871
 Arthur Haygarth, Scores & Biographies, Volume 11 (1869-1870), Lillywhite, 1871
 John Wisden's Cricketers' Almanack, 1871

1870 in English cricket
English cricket seasons in the 19th century